Hambaeksan is a mountain between the county of Jeongseon and the city of Taebaek, Gangwon-do in South Korea.

See also
 List of mountains in Korea

Notes

References 
 

Mountains of Gangwon Province, South Korea
Jeongseon County
Taebaek
Mountains of South Korea
One-thousanders of South Korea
Taebaek Mountains